Wallace Building may refer to:

in the United States (by state)
 Wallace Building (Little Rock, Arkansas), listed on the NRHP in Arkansas
Wallace Block-Old Saline Village Hall, Saline, Michigan, listed on the National Register of Historic Places in Washtenaw County, Michigan
 56 Pine Street, in Manhattan, New York City, listed on the NRHP in New York, originally known as the Wallace Building

See also
Wallace House (disambiguation)